HMS Warwick was a 50-gun fourth rate ship of the line of the Royal Navy, built at Deptford and launched in 1696.

She was rebuilt according to the 1706 Establishment at Rotherhithe, and relaunched on 9 January 1711. Warwick was broken up in 1726.

Notes

References

Lavery, Brian (2003) The Ship of the Line - Volume 1: The development of the battlefleet 1650-1850. Conway Maritime Press. .

Ships of the line of the Royal Navy
1690s ships
Ships built in Rotherhithe
Ships built in Deptford